Andrea Cesalpino (Latinized as Andreas Cæsalpinus) (6 June 1524 – 23 February 1603) was a Florentine physician, philosopher and botanist.

In his works he classified plants according to their fruits and seeds, rather than alphabetically or by medicinal properties. In 1555, he succeeded Luca Ghini as director of the botanical garden in Pisa.  The botanist Pietro Castelli was one of his students. Cesalpino also did limited work in the field of physiology. He theorized a circulation of the blood. However, he envisioned a "chemical circulation" consisting of repeated evaporation and condensation of blood, rather than the concept of "physical circulation" popularized by the writings of William Harvey (1578–1657).

Biography 

Cesalpino was born in Arezzo, Tuscany.

For his studies at the University of Pisa his instructor in medicine was R. Colombo (d. 1559), and in botany the celebrated Luca Ghini. After completing his course he taught philosophy, medicine, and botany for many years at the same university, besides making botanical explorations in various parts of Italy. At this time the first botanical gardens in Europe were laid out; the earliest at Padua, in 1546; the next at Pisa in 1547 by Ghini, who was its first director. Ghini was succeeded by Cesalpino, who had charge of the Pisan garden 1554–1558. When far advanced in years Cesalpino accepted a call to Rome as professor of medicine at University of Rome La Sapienza and physician to Pope Clement VIII. It is not positively certain whether he also became the chief superintendent of the Roman botanical garden which had been laid out about 1566 by one of his most celebrated pupils, Michele Mercati.

Philosophical works 
All of Cesalpino's writings show the man of genius and the profound thinker. His style, it is true, is often heavy, yet in spite of the scholastic form in which his works are cast, passages of great beauty often occur. Modern botanists and physiologists who are not acquainted with the writings of Aristotle find Cesalpino's books obscure; their failure to comprehend them has frequently misled them in their judgment of his achievement.

No comprehensive summing up of the results of Cesalpino's investigations, founded on a critical study of all his works has appeared, neither has there been a complete edition of his writings. Seven of these are positively known, and most of the seven have been printed several times, although none have appeared since the 17th century. In the following list the date of publication given is that of the first edition.

His most important philosophical work is Quaestionum peripateticarum libri V (1569). Cesalpino proves himself in this to be one of the most eminent and original students of Aristotle in the 16th century. His writings, however, show traces of the influence of Averroes, hence he is an Averroistic Aristotelean; apparently he was also inclined to pantheism, consequently he was included, later, in the Spinozists before Spinoza. A Protestant opponent of Aristotelian views, Nicolaus Taurellus wrote several times against Cesalpino. The work of Taurellus entitled Alpes cæsae, etc. (1597), is entirely devoted to combating the opinions of Cesalpino, as the play on the name Cæsalpinus shows. Nearly one hundred years later Cesalpino's views were again attacked by Samuel Parker, in a work entitled Disputationes de Deo et providentia divina (1678).

Cesalpino repeatedly asserted the steadfastness of his Catholic principles and his readiness to acknowledge the falsity of any philosophical opinions expounded by him as Aristotelean doctrine, which should be contrary to revelation. In Italy he was in high favour both with the secular and spiritual rulers.

Medical and physiological works 
Cesalpino's physiological investigations concerning the circulation of the blood are well known, but even up to the present time they have been as often overestimated as undervalued. An examination of the various passages in his writings which bear upon the question shows that although it must be said that Cesalpino had penetrated further into the secret of circulation of the blood than any other physiologist before William Harvey, still he had not attained a thorough knowledge, founded on anatomical research, of the entire course of the blood. Besides the work Quæstionum peripateticarum already mentioned, reference should be made to Quaestionum medicarum libri duo (1593).

Botanical works 
His most important publication was De plantis libri XVI (1583). The date of its publication, 1583, is one of the most important in the history of botany before Carl Linnaeus. The work is dedicated to the Grand Duke Francesco I de' Medici. Unlike the "herbals" of that period, it contains no illustrations. The first section, including thirty pages of the work, is the part of most importance for botany in general. From the beginning of the 17th century up to the present day botanists have agreed in the opinion that Cesalpino in this work, in which he took Aristotle for his guide, laid the foundation of the morphology and physiology of plants and produced the first scientific classification of flowering plants. Three things, above all, give the book the stamp of individuality: the large number of original, acute observations, especially on flowers, fruits, and seeds, made, moreover, before the invention of the microscope, the selection of the organs of fructification for the foundation of his botanical system; finally, the ingenious and at the same time strictly philosophical handling of the rich material gathered by observation. Cesalpino's selection of seeds and seed-receptacles as the primary criteria for plant classification heavily influenced the classificatory work of John Ray, a major seventeenth-century British naturalist. Cesalpino issued a publication supplementary to this work, entitled Appendix ad libros de plantis et quaestiones peripateticas (1603).

Cesalpino is also famous in the history of botany as one of the first botanists to make an herbarium; one of the oldest herbaria still in existence is that which he arranged about 1550–60 for Bishop Alfonso Tornabono. After many changes of fortune the herbarium is now in the Museo di Storia Naturale di Firenze at Florence. It consists of 260 folio pages arranged in three volumes bound in red leather, and contains 768 species of plants. A work of some value for chemistry, mineralogy, and geology was issued by him under the title De metallicis libri tres (Rome, 1596). Some of its matter recalls the discoveries made at the end of the eighteenth century, as those of Antoine Lavoisier and René Just Haüy, it also shows a correct understanding of fossils.

The Franciscan friar Charles Plumier gave the name of Cæsalpinia to a plant genus and Linnaeus retained it in his system. At the present day this genus includes approximately 150 species and belongs family Fabaceae, subfamily Cæsalpinioideae, which contains a large number of useful plants. Linnaeus in his writings often quotes his great predecessor in the science of botany and praises Cesalpino in the following lines:

Quisquis hic exstiterit primos concedat honoresCasalpine Tibi primaque certa dabit.

Geology 
As mentioned above, De metallicis libri tres (Rome, 1596) was of value for mineralogy and geology, displaying a correct understanding of fossils. Charles Lyell's Principles of Geology states that in 1596,

<blockquote>
Cesalpino, a celebrated botanist, conceived that fossil shells had been left on the land by the sea, and had concreted into stone during the consolidation of the soil."<ref>Charles Lyell, Principles of Geology, 1832, pp. 30</ref>
</blockquote>

 Sources 

 External links 

 Some places and memories related to Andrea Cesalpino on Himetop – The History of Medicine Topographical Database
 De plantis, 1583, on Google Books.
 De metallicis'', 1596, on Google Books.
 De Metallicis Libri Tres – full digital facsimile at Linda Hall Library
 

1524 births
1603 deaths
16th-century Latin-language writers
17th-century Latin-language writers
16th-century Italian botanists
Italian philosophers
Italian Roman Catholics
16th-century Italian physicians
17th-century Italian physicians
People from Arezzo
Pre-Linnaean botanists
Academic staff of the Sapienza University of Rome
Academic staff of the University of Pisa